Anna Cristina Pujol Muñoz (born 29 October 1990) is a Spanish professional racing cyclist, who currently rides for Spanish UCI Women's Continental Team .

References

External links
 

1990 births
Living people
Spanish female cyclists
Place of birth missing (living people)
21st-century Spanish women